Timothy S. Armstrong (born May 12, 1967) is a Canadian retired professional ice hockey player. He played 11 games in the National Hockey League with the Toronto Maple Leafs during the 1988–89 season. The rest of his career, which lasted from 1987 to 1991, was mainly spent in the American Hockey League.

Early life 
Armstrong was born in Toronto, Ontario. As a youth, he played in the 1980 Quebec International Pee-Wee Hockey Tournament with the Toronto Young Nationals minor ice hockey team.

Career 
Armstrong played 11 games for his hometown Toronto Maple Leafs in the 1988–89 NHL season, scoring one goal.

Personal life
His daughter, Hannah Armstrong was part of Canada's National Women's Under-18 Team to a gold medal at the 2010 IIHF World Women's Under-18 Championship in Chicago. As a member of the gold medal-winning squad, a hockey card of her was featured in the Upper Deck 2010 World of Sports card series.

Career statistics

Regular season and playoffs

References

External links
 

1967 births
Living people
Binghamton Rangers players
Canadian ice hockey centres
Newmarket Saints players
Toronto Maple Leafs draft picks
Toronto Maple Leafs players
Toronto Marlboros players
VEU Feldkirch players